Arcade is a 1993 B-movie science fiction film directed by Albert Pyun, written by David S. Goyer and produced by Full Moon Entertainment. It stars Megan Ward, Peter Billingsley, John de Lancie, Sharon Farrell, Seth Green, A. J. Langer, and Bryan Dattilo.

Plot
Alex Manning (Megan Ward) is a troubled suburban teenager. Her mother committed suicide and the school counselor feels that she has not dealt with her feelings properly.  Manning and her friends decide to visit the local video arcade known as "Dante's Inferno" where a new virtual reality arcade game called Arcade is being test marketed by a computer company CEO, Difford, who is more than willing to hand out free samples of the home console version and hype up the game as if his job is depending on it, and it is.

However, it soon becomes clear that the teenagers who play the game and lose are being imprisoned inside the virtual reality world by the central villain: Arcade. It would seem that Arcade was once a little boy who was beaten to death by his mother, and the computer company felt it would be a good idea to use some of the boy's brain cells in order to make the game's villain more realistic. Instead, it made the game deadly. The game's programmer knew there would be a problem with this, and even tried, but failed, to convince the computer company, Vertigo/Tronics, to halt the game's release because of the company's unorthodox decision to use human brain cells in the game's development.

Nick and Alex enlist the help of the game's programmer and head to the video arcade for a final showdown with Arcade and his deadly virtual world. While Alex is able to release her friends from a virtual prison, she also ended up freeing the evil little boy, who taunts Alex in the final moments of the film.

In the original CGI version, however, the film ends on a somewhat happier note, with Alex, her friends, and Albert (the programmer) simply walking away from Dante's Inferno, with the donor's soul seemingly laid to rest.

Cast

Production
The film features heavy use of CGI, which was fully redone after The Walt Disney Company named Full Moon in a potential lawsuit. The Sky Cycles in this film resembled the light cycles from Disney's Tron. The VideoZone video magazine (a staple of Full Moon films during the 1990s) as well as some trailers showed footage from the original version of the film. As a rarity, the VideoZone featured on the Full Moon Classics DVD release of the film contains no footage of the released film's CGI, but only of the original film's version.

Despite the change in CGI, the original CGI version did manage to find a release in some places outside of North America, such as Argentina, Germany, Poland and Italy.

See also
 Brainscan
 The Dungeonmaster
 Tron
 Johnny Mnemonic
 The Lawnmower Man

References

External links
 
 

1993 direct-to-video films
1993 horror films
1993 films
American science fiction horror films
1990s monster movies
Direct-to-video science fiction films
Fictional artificial intelligences
Films about video games
1990s science fiction horror films
Films about telepresence
Films about computing
Films with screenplays by David S. Goyer
Films about virtual reality
American monster movies
American direct-to-video films
Full Moon Features films
1990s English-language films
Films directed by Albert Pyun
1990s American films